Badrabad or Badarabad may refer to various places in Iran:
 Badrabad, Darab, Fars Province
 Badrabad, Sepidan, Fars Province
 Badrabad, Baft, Kerman Province
 Badrabad, Narmashir, Kerman Province
 Badrabad, Rigan, Kerman Province
 Badrabad, Kermanshah
 Badrabad, Kurdistan
 Badrabad-e Olya, Lorestan Province
 Badrabad-e Sofla, Lorestan Province
 Badrabad, West Azerbaijan
 Badrabad, Yazd